The Savii or Savi del Consiglio dei Pregadi, also known as the Savi[i] Grandi ('Great Wise Men'), were senior magistrates of the Republic of Venice.

History
The positions were created in 1380 to assist the councils comprising the government of the Republic. Their duty was to "prepare [the government's] agenda, frame resolutions, defend them, and supervise their execution". 

Their number was not fixed in the beginning, but was eventually set at six. As with other higher magistracies of Venice, restrictions were placed on the eligibility to the office: the members served a term of six months and could not be re-elected to the same office for six months thereafter. To ensure continuity, the appointments to the office were staggered: three took office on 1 October, three on 1 January, three on 1 April, and three on 1 July. They rotated through their duties, with  holding office for a week.

The  were always present in, and in charge of the agenda of, the daily deliberations of the Full College (the Venetian cabinet). They were also obliged to be present in all sessions of the Council of Ten that had to do with foreign affairs. Consequently, and since no proposal could appear for vote before the Senate without having first been reviewed by the College, the  came to be part of a small core of officials who exercised the most control over the governance of the Republic, alongside the Doge of Venice, the six ducal councillors, and the heads of the Ten. The post was accordingly given exclusively to the most highly regarded members of the Venetian patriciate.

References

Sources
 
 
 
 

Government of the Republic of Venice
1380 establishments
14th-century establishments in the Republic of Venice